The Legion Duel, known as the Legion Pro in China, is an Android gaming smartphone manufactured by Lenovo as the first Legion-branded phone, unveiled on 22 July 2020.

References 

Mobile phones introduced in 2020
Android (operating system) devices
Lenovo smartphones
Lenovo Legion
Mobile phones with multiple rear cameras
Mobile phones with 4K video recording